Ricardo Ulpiano Colóm y Ferrer (3 April 1861 – 13 February 1906) was Mayor of Ponce, Puerto Rico, during part of 1898. He was the second of two mayors to lead the municipality of Ponce under the Spanish Crown's "Decreto Autonómico para Puerto Rico", whereby Puerto Rico was granted autonomy by Spain.

Early years
He was born in Ponce, Puerto Rico on 3 April 1861. His parents were José Colom and Belen Ferrer.

He was an attorney, a member of the House of Delegates of Puerto Rico, a councilman for the municipality of Ponce, an assistant in the Ponce Fire Department, a director and vice-president of the Banco Crédito y Ahorro Ponceño, and a municipal judge, among the various other positions he held.

Mayoral term
Colóm y Ferrer became mayor of Ponce on 8 July 1898. He was the sitting mayor of Ponce at the time when the Americans took possession of the city on 28 July 1898. Upon the American invasion, Colom tendered his resignation, but it was not accepted by the American Major General James H. Wilson, who instead extended Colóm's jurisdiction to additional adjacent towns as the American troops advanced.

Death and legacy
Colom Ferrer died in Ponce on 13 February 1906 as a result of an "ataque de angina de pecho" (chest angina). He was interred at the "Antiguo Cementerio de esta Ciudad", today's (2019) Panteón Nacional Román Baldorioty de Castro.  In Ponce there is a street in Urbanización Las Delicias of Barrio Magueyes named after him.

See also
 List of Puerto Ricans
 List of mayors of Ponce, Puerto Rico

Notes

References

Further reading
 Fay Fowlie de Flores. Ponce, Perla del Sur: Una Bibliográfica Anotada. Second Edition. 1997. Ponce, Puerto Rico: Universidad de Puerto Rico en Ponce. p. 263. Item 1319. 
 Ana Mercedes Santiago de Curet. "Contrapunto boricua: Ponce y San Juan and te la llegada de los americanos." La nación soñada: Cuba, Puerto Rico y Filipinas ante el 98; Actas del Congreso Internacional celebrado en Aranjuez del 24 al 28 de abril de 1995. pp. 559–566. Aranjuez, España: Doce Calles. 1996. (Colegio Universitario Tecnológico de Ponce, CUTPO).
 Fay Fowlie de Flores. Ponce, Perla del Sur: Una Bibliográfica Anotada. Second Edition. 1997. Ponce, Puerto Rico: Universidad de Puerto Rico en Ponce. p. 264. Item 1320. 
 Ana Mercedes Santiago de Curet. "La reacción de Ponce a la ocupación americana: 1898." Revista del Instituto de Cultura Puertorriqueña. Año 90 (Octubre-Diciembre 1985.) pp. 9-16. (Colegio Universitario Tecnológico de Ponce, CUTPO / PUCPR).
 Fay Fowlie de Flores. Ponce, Perla del Sur: Una Bibliográfica Anotada. Second Edition. 1997. Ponce, Puerto Rico: Universidad de Puerto Rico en Ponce. p. 110. Item 566. 
 Guillermo Atiles Garcia. Kaleidoscopio. Ponce, Puerto Rico: Establecimiento tipográfico de Manuel López. 1905. (Colegio Universitario Tecnológico de Ponce, CUTPO)
 Fay Fowlie de Flores. Ponce, Perla del Sur: Una Bibliográfica Anotada. Second Edition. 1997. Ponce, Puerto Rico: Universidad de Puerto Rico en Ponce. p. 116. Item 589. 
 Felix Bernier Matos. Cromos ponceños. (por Fray Justo) Ponce, Puerto Rico: Imprenta "La Libertad." 1896. (Colegio Universitario Tecnológico de Ponce, CUTPO)

1861 births
1906 deaths
Mayors of Ponce, Puerto Rico
Burials at Panteón Nacional Román Baldorioty de Castro